The Old Colony Building may refer to:

Colony Club buildings in New York City
Old Colony Building (Chicago), former name of a Chicago Landmark on the National Register of Historic Places